Solveig Muren Sanden (17 April 1918 – 23 November 2013) was a Norwegian illustrator and comics artist. She was born in Vrådal in Kviteseid. She published her first illustration in the children's magazine Norsk Barneblad in 1932. She is known for the comics series Tuss og Troll and Smørbukk. In 1973 she was the first recipient of Norwegian Ministry of Culture's comics prize. A bronze sculpture of "Smørbukk", made by Trygve Barstad, was unveiled in Vrådal in 2012.

References

External links

1918 births
2013 deaths
People from Kviteseid
Norwegian illustrators
Norwegian comics artists
Norwegian female comics artists
Norwegian women illustrators